The Campo Grande tree frog (Boana cymbalum) is a species of frog in the family Hylidae endemic to Brazil. Its natural habitats are subtropical or tropical moist lowland forests and rivers. It is threatened by habitat loss.

References

cymbalum
Endemic fauna of Brazil
Amphibians described in 1963
Taxonomy articles created by Polbot